Sir John Pakington, 4th Baronet (1671–1727) of Westwood, near Droitwich, Worcestershire was an English Tory politician who sat in the English and British House of Commons between 1690 and 1727. 

Pakington was the only son of Sir John Pakington, 3rd Baronet and his wife Margaret Keyt, daughter of Sir John Keyt, 1st Baronet, of Ebrington, Gloucestershire. He matriculated at  St John's College, Oxford in 1688. Also in 1688, he succeeded his father to the baronetcy and Westwood House. He married Frances Parker, the daughter of Sir Henry Parker, 2nd Baronet MP of  Honington, Warwickshire by licence dated  28 August 1691.

Pakington was known for his Tory and High Church views. He was returned as Member of Parliament for  Worcestershire at the 1690 general election, but did not stand in 1695. He was returned for Worcestershire in contests  at the 1698 general election, the two general elections of 1701 and the  1702 English general election. Also in 1702 he was returned as MP for Aylesbury, but opted to sit for Worcestershire. He was returned for Worcestershire in a contest at the   1705 English general election and  unopposed in 1708,  1710 and 1713.

Pakington was returned in a contest for Worcestershire at the 1715 British general election and unopposed at the 1722 British general election. He was appointed  Recorder for Worcester in 1726, a year before to his death.

Pakington married as his second wife  Hester Perrott, the daughter and heiress of Sir Herbert Perrott of Haroldston, Pembrokeshire. He died just after Parliament was dissolved on 13 August 1727. He had three daughters but no sons by his first marriage. He was succeeded as an MP and a baronet by his only  son  from his second marriage, Sir Herbert Pakington, 5th Baronet. In the latter part of the eighteenth century he was said to be the model for Roger de Coverley, the mildly satirical figure of the Tory gentry guyed in The Spectator, though there is little factual evidence to support this identification.

References

1671 births
1727 deaths
People from Droitwich Spa
Alumni of St John's College, Oxford
British MPs 1707–1708
British MPs 1708–1710
British MPs 1710–1713
British MPs 1713–1715
British MPs 1715–1722
British MPs 1722–1727
Members of the Parliament of Great Britain for Worcestershire
Tory MPs (pre-1834)
English MPs 1690–1695
English MPs 1698–1700
English MPs 1701
English MPs 1701–1702
English MPs 1702–1705
English MPs 1705–1707
Members of the Parliament of England for Worcestershire
Baronets in the Baronetage of England